Zaka may refer to:
ZAKA, Israeli emergency response team

Places
Zaka, Iran, a village in Khuzestan Province, Iran
Zaka District, Zimbabwe
Zaka (Senatorial constituency), roughly congruent with Zaka District
Zaka, Gounghin, a village in Gounghin Department, Kouritenga Province, Burkina Faso
Zaka, Tenkodogo, a village in Tenkodogo Department, Boulgou Province, Burkina Faso
Shōkō zaka, in Japan

See also
Zakka (disambiguation)